This is a list of cemeteries in France.

 Cimetière de Bagneux, Paris – burial place for Jean Vigo, Gribouille, Alfred Jarry and others.
 Catacombs of Paris, millions of remains in caves and tunnels under the city of Paris.
 Cimetière de Batignolles, Paris, resting place of France's famous sons André Breton and Paul-Marie Verlaine, among others.
 Cimetière des Gonards, Versailles, burial place for Edith Wharton, Pierre Napoleon Bonaparte and others.
 Cimetière de La Guillotière, Lyon
 Cimetière de Loyasse, Lyon
 Grand Jas Cemetery, Cannes – buried here are Lily Pons, Peter Carl Fabergé, Martine Carol and other celebrities
 Cimetière de Levallois-Perret, Paris, resting place of Maurice Ravel, Louise Michel (The Red Virgin) and Gustave Eiffel
 Les Invalides, Paris – war heroes including Napoleon
 Cimetière de Montmartre, Paris – resting place of Edgar Degas, Heinrich Heine, Georges Feydeau, the Cancan dancer, known as La Goulue (Louise Weber) among other artists (notably Dalida and Vaslav Nijinsky) and writers (like Alexandre Dumas, fils). But also many others. Émile Zola was initially buried here, but his remains were later moved to the Panthéon. His gravestone can still be seen here, however.
 Cimetière du Montparnasse, Paris – serves the great artistic quarter of Montparnasse, including the graves of Charles Baudelaire, Eugène Ionesco, Samuel Beckett, Jean-Paul Sartre, Jean Seberg, Serge Gainsbourg and Man Ray. Pierre Laval and Porfirio Díaz are also buried here among many, many others.
 Neuilly-sur-Seine community cemetery – resting place of Anatole France among others.
 Panthéon, Paris – France's most honored, including Voltaire, Jean-Jacques Rousseau and Émile Zola.
 Cimetière de Pantin in Paris is the burial site of the singer Damia, and other notables.
 Cimetière de Passy, Paris – Claude Debussy, Édouard Manet and many others.
 Cimetière du Père Lachaise, Paris – resting place of famous persons such as Colette, Baron Georges Haussmann, Eugène Delacroix, Oscar Wilde, Jim Morrison, Molière, Maurice Merleau-Ponty, Gertrude Stein, Édith Piaf, Marcel Proust and Frédéric Chopin. Many French Holocaust victims (and their camps) are commemorated there.
 Saint Denis Basilica, Paris – burial site for French Royalty.
 Cimetière de Saint-Ouen, Paris – where, on 24 May 1430, Joan of Arc was told to recant or face summary execution. Some of those buried here are the painters Suzanne Valadon, Jules Pascin, and tennis star Suzanne Lenglen.
 Saint Remi Basilica, Reims, Champagne-Ardenne, France
 Cimetière Saint-Vincent, a small cemetery in the Montmartre Quarter of Paris contains the graves of such notables as Arthur Honegger, Marcel Carné, Maurice Utrillo and others.
 Saint Roch Cemetery, Grenoble, painters, sculptors and mayors.
 Besancon (St. Claude) Communal Cemetery, Doubs.

Foreign cemeteries
 Sainte-Geneviève-des-Bois Russian Cemetery: Ivan Bunin, Rudolph Nureyev, Felix Yusupov, Andrei Tarkovsky
 Normandy American Cemetery and Memorial
 Bény-sur-Mer Canadian War Cemetery
 Bretteville-sur-Laize Canadian War Cemetery
 Orglandes German war cemetery
 Orry-la-Ville, Erebegraafplaats

References

 
 
France